Tone Damli Aaberge (born 12 April 1988) is a Norwegian singer-songwriter and actress. She became famous for being a contestant in the Norwegian version of the Idol series.

Damli was the runner-up in the Norwegian version of Idol in 2005, following Jorun Stiansen in the final.
Despite not winning, she has become very popular in her native Norway releasing four albums, Bliss, Sweet Fever, I Know, and Cocool. Bliss and I Know have been certified gold in Norway, one Compilation album, one Christmas album, one EP and 21 singles. She contended in the Melodi Grand Prix 2009 finals, with the song Butterflies, and ended up in the runner-up position, following Alexander Rybak. She also participated in the Norwegian version of Dancing with the Stars in 2006 finishing in third place.
She contended together with Erik Segerstedt in the Swedish Melodifestivalen 2013 semi-finals, with the song Hello Goodbye. They performed in the second semi-final and qualified to the Andra Chansen in which they failed to advance to the finals.. She participated again in Melodi Grand Prix 2020 with the song Hurts Sometimes and was one of the automatically qualifiers for the final. She failed to advance to the Gold final.

On 18 August 2012, it was announced on the official Idol website that Damli will be the first of an all-new four-member jury of former Idol contestants to celebrate 10 years since the official debut of Idol in Norway, along with the first winner of the series, Kurt Nilsen.

Personal life
In 2013, Damli entered a relationship with Markus Foss and the following year on 28 April 2014 welcomed a girl.

Discography

Albums

Extended plays

Singles

Notes
1. Releases until 2009 credited to Tone Damli Aaberge. From 2010 onward to Tone Damli.

Filmography
2006: Over the Hedge – Norwegian voice of "Heather"

References

External links

 

1988 births
Living people
Musicians from Sogndal
Norwegian pop singers
Norwegian television presenters
Norwegian voice actresses
Melodi Grand Prix contestants
Idol (Norwegian TV series) participants
21st-century Norwegian singers
21st-century Norwegian women singers
Norwegian women television presenters
Melodifestivalen contestants of 2013